Saman Es'hagh Beigi (born November 22, 1982) known as Sami Beigi is an Iranian singer and songwriter currently living in Irvine, California.

In an interview with "Zarebin" and "Voice of Farsi", he mentioned that he was raised in Sweden. Beigi attended musical school in which he learned to play many different instruments, began to write and to produce music. His main instrument is the guitar.

He is a former member of the Persian Black Cats band and gained recognition with the song he wrote for Black Cats, entitled "Yeki Bood Yeki Nabood."

Two years later, he left the band and started his solo career as a singer and songwriter. He made many successful singles, among which "In Eshghe", "Ey Joonam", and "HMG", are some of the most popular ones. His single "Kaghaz va Ghalam", debuted on February 28 of 2014 and received more than 700,000 replays on RadioJavan website in only four days.

Beigi is featured in BBC Persian's Nowrouz 1393 special TV program. He performed three of his singles "Ey joonam", "HMG", and "Kaghaz & Ghalam", and in the interview he states that it took him about two to three years to finish writing "Kaghaz & Ghalam". In another interview with "Voice of Farsi", he states that although he has been writing songs and singing since the age of 15 years, he never thought he could launch a successful solo career.

Albums 
2018 : Padeshah

References

1982 births
Living people
Iranian pop singers
Iranian male singers
Musicians from Tehran
Iranian singer-songwriters
Iranian emigrants to Sweden
Iranian expatriates in Sweden